Mili is a 2015 Malayalam drama film directed by Rajesh Pillai. Described as a "heroine-centric motivational film," Mili has Amala Paul in the title role along with Nivin Pauly as male lead. The film, produced by Dr. Avinash Unnithan and Sathish B. Sathish under Ordinary Films, marks the debut of editor Mahesh Narayanan as scriptwriter. Anishlal R S handles the cinematography. The story revolves around an introvert girl who struggles hard to meet others' expectations. Shamna Kasim, Sanusha, Praveena, Sai Kumar and Amol Parashar appear in significant roles. The film started its shooting on 10 May 2014 at Trivandrum. The shooting of the film was completed on 9 November 2014. Mili released on 23 January 2015 to positive reviews.

Plot
Mili Nair is an introvert who is very depressed. Her self-affectation and inferiority complex puts off everyone. Nobody likes her character or even attempts to help her. Mili chooses to rise above the challenges and take back the reins of her life. Her transformation and learning to deal with her emotions forms the crux of the movie. Meanwhile, there is Naveen, a soft-skills trainer who becomes a support for Mili.

Cast

Amala Paul as Mili Nair
Nivin Pauly as Naveen
Sai Kumar as Mili's father
Sanusha as Anupama
Amol Parashar as Arun Iyyer
Shamna Kasim as Renuka
Idavela Babu as School Manager 
Poojappura Radhakrishnan as Security staff
Sanil Kumar as Association Member
Santhosh K as Association Member
Ashraf Pezhumoodu as Assication Member
Premalal as School Principal
Praveena as Nancy
Ambika as Mercy
Soumya Sadanandan as Mili's friend
Sija Rose as Raji
Swapna Menon as Mii's friend 
Riya Saira as Kalyani
Vanitha Krishnachandran as Sudha
Bindu Panicker as Mili's mother
Sangeetha Mohan as Roopa
Karthika Kannan as School Management Member
Anju Aravind as Thara
Anjali Aneesh Upasana (Anjali Nair) as Anitha
Devi Ajith as Hostel Warden
Ranjini Menon as Shaiby,School teacher
Master Neil Kaushik as Nikhil
Baby Nandana Varma as Young Mili
Baby Ammu
Fardeen Ahamed Fasil as boy reading the book

Music

The music was composed by Gopi Sunder with Shaan Rahman. Background score was by Gopi Sunder.

Box office
It completed 50 days' run in some releasing centres. The total distribution share was  doing a business of  considering theatrical gross and satellite rights. The film was one of the "profitable" Malayalam films in the first half of 2015.

References

External links
 

2015 films
Films scored by Shaan Rahman
Indian drama films
Films shot in Thiruvananthapuram
2010s Malayalam-language films
Films directed by Rajesh Pillai